In analytic number theory, the Siegel–Walfisz theorem was obtained by Arnold Walfisz as an application of a theorem by Carl Ludwig Siegel to primes in arithmetic progressions. It is a refinement both of the prime number theorem and of Dirichlet's theorem on primes in arithmetic progressions.

Statement
Define

where  denotes the von Mangoldt function, and let φ denote Euler's totient function.

Then the theorem states that given any real number N there exists a positive constant CN depending only on N such that

whenever (a, q) = 1 and

Remarks
The constant CN is not effectively computable because Siegel's theorem is ineffective.

From the theorem we can deduce the following bound regarding the prime number theorem for arithmetic progressions: If, for (a, q) = 1, by  we denote the number of primes less than or equal to x which are congruent to a mod q, then

where N, a, q, CN and φ are as in the theorem, and Li denotes the logarithmic integral.

References

Theorems in analytic number theory
Theorems about prime numbers